North Salt Lake is a city in Davis County, Utah, United States. It is part of the Ogden–Clearfield, Utah Metropolitan Statistical Area. The population was 16,322 at the 2010 census, which had risen to an estimated 20,948 as of 2019.

The city is often casually known as North Salt Lake City as it shares a municipal boundary with Salt Lake City to the south, though the city's actual corporate name is "The City of North Salt Lake". The error also has been solidified with the Federal Communications Commission, which has radio station KALL (700) officially licensed to "North Salt Lake City", though for all intents and purposes that station serves the Salt Lake City market in general.

Demographics

According to estimates from the U.S. Census Bureau, as of 2016, there were 20,301 people in North Salt Lake. The racial makeup of the county was 75.4% non-Hispanic White, 0.3% Black, 0.8% Native American, 3.1% Asian, and 5.0% from two or more races. 13.5% of the population were Hispanic or Latino of any race.

Geography
North Salt Lake is located in southern Davis County; it is bordered to the north by Woods Cross, to the northeast by Bountiful, and to the south by Salt Lake City in Salt Lake County.

See also

 List of cities and towns in Utah

References

External links

 

Wasatch Front
Cities in Utah
Cities in Davis County, Utah
Ogden–Clearfield metropolitan area